Flint Strong is an upcoming American biographical sports film by Rachel Morrison in her feature directional debut, based on the documentary T-Rex. It stars Ryan Destiny, Judy Greer and Brian Tyree Henry.

Plot
Claressa "T-Rex" Shields trains to box in the 2012 Summer Olympics.

Cast
 Ryan Destiny as Claressa Shields
 Judy Greer
 Brian Tyree Henry as Jason Crutchfield
 Oluniké Adeliyi as Jackie Shields
 De'Adre Aziza as Mickey

Production
On October 7, 2016, Universal Pictures hired Barry Jenkins to adapt the documentary T-Rex with the possibility to direct the film. On June 19, 2019, Rachel Morrison was set to make her directorial debut on Flint Strong; Jenkins would produce with Michael De Luca, Elishia Holmes, Zackary Canepari, and Drea Cooper. Canepari and Cooper left the project for unknown reasons.

On November 13, 2019, Ryan Destiny was cast as Shields. On February 5, 2020, Ice Cube was cast as Shields' coach, Jason Crutchfield. Judy Greer was added on May 14. However, on October 29, 2021, it was reported that Cube had left the project after refusing to get vaccinated for COVID-19 to film Oh Hell No for Columbia Pictures, putting the film in turnaround.

Principal photography began on March 11, 2020, but on March 13, production was halted due to the COVID-19 pandemic. In an interview with The Guardian, Shields stated that production was set to resume in June 2021. However, the project entered a long delay due to being offloaded by Universal. It would be picked up by Metro-Goldwyn-Mayer, and on May 25, 2022, Brian Tyree Henry joined the cast to replace Cube and Oluniké Adeliyi joined to play Shields' mother, with filming resuming later that month. On July 6, 2022, De'Adre Aziza joined the cast as Mickey.

See also
Boxing at the 2012 Summer Olympics – Women's middleweight

References

External links
 

Upcoming films
American biographical drama films
American boxing films
American sports drama films
Biographical films about sportspeople
Cultural depictions of boxers
Film productions suspended due to the COVID-19 pandemic
Films about the 2012 Summer Olympics
Films about women's sports
Films produced by Michael De Luca
Films scored by Tamar-kali
Films set in 2012
Films set in 2016
Films set in London
Films set in Michigan
Films set in Rio de Janeiro (city)
Metro-Goldwyn-Mayer films
Upcoming directorial debut films
Upcoming English-language films